Derek Collier (1927 – 24 June 2008) was an English violinist and leader of the Bournemouth Symphony Orchestra. He was also the maternal grandfather of Jacob Collier.

Collier studied at the Royal Academy of Music in London and also with Alfredo Campoli. He performed as a soloist with many of the leading British and North American orchestras and gave the first performances in Britain of violin concertos by Dag Wirén, Joaquín Rodrigo and Boris Blacher.

Collier used a violin made by Pietro Guarneri and he made a number of commercial recordings for EMI and Decca with pianists including Ernest Lush and Daphne Ibbott.

References

External links

BBC broadcasts of Derek Collier performances (British Library)
Blog about the British Library collection (British Library)

British male violinists
1927 births
2008 deaths
English classical violinists
English male musicians
Alumni of the Royal Academy of Music
20th-century English musicians
20th-century classical violinists
20th-century British male musicians
Male classical violinists
Date of birth missing
Place of birth missing
Place of death missing